The following article presents a summary of the 1934 football (soccer) season in Brazil, which was the 33rd season of competitive football in the country.

Campeonato Paulista

Final Standings

Palestra Itália-SP declared as the Campeonato Paulista champions.

State championship champions

Other competition champions

(1)Two different Campeonato Brasileiro de Seleções Estaduais editions were contested in 1934. The professional competition was organized by the FBF (Federação Brasileira de Futebol) while the amateur competition was organized by the CBD (Confederação Brasileira de Desportos). São Paulo won the professional competition while Bahia won the amateur one.

Brazil national team
The following table lists all the games played by the Brazil national football team in official competitions and friendly matches during 1934.

References

 Brazilian competitions at RSSSF
 1934 Brazil national team matches at RSSSF

 
Seasons in Brazilian football
Brazil